Mangifera sylvatica, also known as the Himalayan mango, pickling mango, or Nepal mango, is a species of plant in the family Anacardiaceae. It is found in Bangladesh, Cambodia, China (Yunnan), India (Assam, Darjeeling, Sikkim), Myanmar, Nepal, Bhutan and Thailand. The fruit measure .

References

External links

sylvatica
Least concern plants
Trees of Bangladesh
Trees of Cambodia
Trees of China
Flora of East Himalaya
Flora of Assam (region)
Trees of Myanmar
Trees of Nepal
Trees of Thailand
Taxonomy articles created by Polbot